In organometallic chemistry, metal sulfur dioxide complexes are complexes that contain  sulfur dioxide, bonded to a transition metal.  Such compounds are common but are mainly of theoretical interest.  Historically, the study of these compounds has provided insights into the mechanisms of migratory insertion reactions.

Bonding modes

Sulfur dioxide forms complexes with many transition metals.  Most numerous are complexes with metals i in oxidation state 0 or +1.

In most cases SO2 binds in monodentate fashion, attaching to the metal through sulfur.  Such complexes are further subdivided according to the planarity or pyramidalization at sulfur.   The various bonding modes are:
η1-SO2, planar (meaning that the MSO2 subunit forms a plane). In such complexes, SO2 is classified as a 2e donor complemented by pi-back bonding into the empty pz orbital localized on sulfur.
η1-SO2, pyramidal (meaning that the MSO2 subunit is pyramidal at sulfur). In such complexes, SO2 is classified as a pure Lewis acid.  The structure is similar to that for conventional Lewis base adducts of SO2.
η2-SO2.  Both S and one O centre are attached to the metal.  The MSO2 subunit is pyramidal at sulfur.  This bonding mode is more common for early metals, which are typically strongly pi-donating. 
η1-SO2, O-bonded.  In such cases, SO2 attaches to a metal via one of its two oxygen centres. Such complexes are prevalent for hard metal cations such as Na+ and Al3+. In these compounds the M-O interaction is usually weak.
More exotic bonding modes are known for clusters.

Preparation
Complexes of the transition metals are usually generated simply by treating the appropriate metal complex with SO2.  The adducts are often weak.  In some cases, SO2 displaces other ligands.

A large number of labile O-bonded SO2 complexes arise from the oxidation of a suspension of the metals in liquid SO2, an excellent solvent.

Reactions
The main reaction of sulfur dioxide promoted by transition metals is its reduction by hydrogen sulfide.  Known as the Claus process, this reaction is conducted on a large scale as a way to remove hydrogen sulfide that arises in hydrotreating processes in refineries.

Insertion of SO2 into metal-ligand bonds
Of academic interest, SO2 acts like a Lewis acid towards the alkyl ligand. The pathway for the insertion of SO2 into metal alkyl bond begins with attack of the alkyl nucleophile on the sulfur centre in SO2.  The "insertion" proceed the sulfur dioxide between the metal and the alkyl ligand leads to the O, O'-sulphinate. Alternatively an O-sulphinate can arise.  Both of these intermediates commonly convert to an S-sulphinate.  S-sulphinate has sulfur–oxygen stretching frequencies from 1250–1000 cm−1 and 1100–1000 cm−1.  The O, O'-sulphinate and O-sulphinate are difficult to distinguish as they have stretching frequencies from 1085–1050 cm−1 and 1000–820 cm−1 or lower. The pathway involving the O, O' sulphinate can generally be ruled out if the original metal complex fulfilled the 18-electron rule because the two metal–oxygen bonds would exceed the 18 electron rule.  
The pathway by which SO2 inserts into a square planar alkyl complexes involves the formation of an adduct.  Thereafter, the alkyl ligand migrates to the SO2.

S2O complexes
Several complexes of disulfur monoxide are known. Most are formed by oxidation peroxide oxidation of a disulfur ligand. In these complexes, the  ligand is invariably bound in an  manner.

 arises when the dithiocarbamate complex  is oxidized with elemental sulfur in air.  Another way to form these complexes is to combine  complexes with hydrogen sulfide.  Complexes formed in this way are: ; .  With hydrosulfide and a base followed by oxygen,  can be made.

References

Transition metals
Coordination chemistry